Mordehai "Moty" Heiblum (מוטי הייבלום – sometimes called Moti Heiblum, born May 25, 1947 in Holon) is an Israeli electrical engineer and condensed matter physicist, known for his research in mesoscopic physics.

Biography
Moty Heiblum was born and raised in Holon. His mother was the only Holocaust survivor in her immediate family, and most of his father's family perished in the Holocaust. From 1967 to 1971 Moty Heiblum served in the Israeli Defense Force (IDF) in the IDF Communications Corps and was an instructor at the IDF Air Force Technical School. Heiblum graduated in electrical engineering from the Technion with a bachelor's degree in 1973 and from Carnegie-Mellon University with a master's degree in 1974. He received in 1978 his Ph.D. with thesis Characteristics of metal-oxide-metal devices supervised by John Roy Whinnery. After completing his Ph.D., Heiblum joined the IBM Thomas J. Watson Research Center.

After working at the IBM Thomas J. Watson Research Center for 12 years, Heiblum returned in 1990 to Israel and established at the Weizmann Institute, with the support of Professor Yoseph Imry, the Joseph H. and Belle R. Braun Center for Submicron Research with the mission to "study and develop submicron semiconductor structures working in the mesoscopic regime." The initial investment for the Submicron Center was approximately $16 million. Heiblum has headed the Submicron Center since its founding in 1990. That same year he was appointed a full professor at the Weizmann Institute. He established the Department of Condensed Matter Physics at the Weizmann Institute and was its first director from 1993 to 1996 and from 2007 to 2012 he was again its director. In 2000 he was appointed to the Alex and Ida Susan Professorial Chair of Submicron Studies.

From 1991 to 1992, Heiblum headed a government committee that advised the Minister of Science on how to encourage the microelectronics industry in the State of Israel. Since 2001, he has chaired the board of directors of Braude College of Engineering. From 1993 to 1996, he was a visiting professor for several weeks each summer at the Vienna University of Technology. From 1996 to 1997 he was on sabbatical as a visiting professor at Stanford University in combination with Hewlett Packard Labs in Palo Alto, California. He was an editor for the journal Semiconductor Science and Technology and is now an editor for the journal Solid State Communications. He organized and conducted, in collaboration with Professor Elisha Cohen of the Technion, the 1998 International Conference of Semiconductors, which was attended by about 1,100 people and held in Jerusalem.

The main focus of Heiblum’s research is the quantum behavior of electrons in high-purity mesoscopic materials, and especially the quantum Hall effect (QHE) regime. Noteworthy highlights of the research done by him and his group are "novel electronic interferometers – demonstrating one-electron and two-electron interference; which-path detectors – allowing to turn 'on and off' electrons’ coherence; detection of fractional charges via sensitive shot noise measurements; and observation of quantized heat flow in the fractional abelian and non-abelian states in the QHE regime."

He received in 1986 the IBM Outstanding Innovation Award and in 2013 the EMET Prize. He was elected a life fellow of the IEEE, a fellow of the American Physical Society (1990), and a member of Israel Academy of Sciences and Humanities (2008). In 2008, he received the Rothschild Prize in physics.

In 2021, he was received the Oliver E. Buckley Condensed Matter Prize with citation:

His doctoral students include Amir Yacoby.

Moty Heiblum's wife Rachel has a PhD in biology from the Hebrew University of Jerusalem. She worked in the Faculty of Agriculture of the Hebrew University of Jerusalem's Rehovot campus. They have four children. He has a younger brother, Zohar Heiblum, who is a director, manager, turn-around specialist, and investor in the high-tech industry.

Selected publications

References

External links
 
  (talk by Moty Heiblum at Tel Aviv University)
  (talk by Moty Heiblum at the Tel Aviv-Tsinghau Xin Center 2nd International Winter School held at Tel Aviv University)
 
 
 
 
  (2009 talk by Moty Heiblum)

1947 births
Living people
People from Holon
Israeli Jews
Israeli electrical engineers
Condensed matter physicists
Israeli physicists
Jewish physicists
Technion – Israel Institute of Technology alumni
Carnegie Mellon University alumni
University of California, Berkeley alumni
IBM employees
Academic staff of Weizmann Institute of Science
Members of the Israel Academy of Sciences and Humanities
Fellows of the American Physical Society
EMET Prize recipients in the Exact Sciences
Oliver E. Buckley Condensed Matter Prize winners